This is the Consejo Mundial de Lucha Libre (CMLL) roster, a list of professional wrestlers who work for the Mexican professional wrestling promotion CMLL. The alias (ring name) of the worker listed while the real name is not listed, most luchadores (wrestlers) keep their real name private, and as such, most are not a matter of public record. If a wrestler is inactive for any reason (due to injury, suspension, not wrestling for 30 days or other), that information is noted in the notes section. Other wrestlers have made guest appearances, especially North American wrestlers who have made special guest appearances, but unless they work a series of shows for CMLL, they will not be listed as part of the general roster.

Male wrestlers

Female wrestlers

Mini-Estrellas

Micro-Estrellas

Footnotes

References

External links
Roster

Consejo Mundial de Lucha Libre
Consejo Mundial de Lucha Libre